The 2006 NCAA Division I baseball tournament was held from June 2 through June 26, . Sixty-four NCAA Division I college baseball teams met after having played their way through a regular season, and for some, a conference tournament, to play in the NCAA tournament.  The tournament culminated with 8 teams in the College World Series at historic Rosenblatt Stadium in Omaha, Nebraska.

After winning the regional and super regional rounds of the 2006 NCAA Division I Baseball Tournament, eight teams advanced to Omaha. Clemson, North Carolina, Oregon State, and Miami (FL) all won their super-regionals and made the trip to the 2006 College World Series. Five national seeds advanced to Omaha: Clemson (1), Rice (2), Cal State Fullerton (5), Georgia (7), and Georgia Tech (8). Third-seeded  and sixth-seeded  both fell in the regionals, while the fourth seed  lost in super regional play.

The first pitch of the 2006 CWS was Friday, June 16, at 1:00 PM CDT (18:00 UTC). The 2006 tournament was only the second time in CWS history in which 16 games were played (the other being the 2003 College World Series).

After losing their tournament opener to Miami (FL), the Oregon State Beavers staved off elimination for four straight games to win their bracket and advance to the championship series. The , who had not lost a three-game series all season, were shut out in consecutive games by the Beavers and failed to score in a CWS-record 23 innings. Oregon State advanced to face North Carolina in the final.

The best-of-three championship series featured Oregon State and North Carolina. Oregon State won the deciding game, 3–2, winning the school's first national title in baseball and its second NCAA championship overall. All games were televised on ESPN and ESPN2.

Oregon State set a CWS record by winning six elimination games (four in bracket play, two in the championship series) and also became the first team ever to lose twice in Omaha and still win the title. Oregon State is the only team besides Holy Cross in 1952 to win six games in the College World Series. Oregon State played in half (eight of 16) of the games in the tournament.

OSU pitcher Jonah Nickerson was named the tournament's Most Outstanding Player.

Five-time national champion LSU was left out of the field of 64, the first time since 1988 that the Tigers failed to qualify for a regional. LSU's overall record of 35–24 merited at-large consideration, but it was undone by poor performance in the Southeastern Conference, where the Tigers finished 8th out of 12 teams at 13–17. LSU won national championships in 1991, '93, '96, '97 and 2000 under Hall of Fame coach Skip Bertman, who was the school's athletic director at this time. Ten days after LSU's season ended, Bertman fired his successor, Smoke Laval, and hired Notre Dame coach Paul Mainieri.

Bids

Automatic bids
Conference champions from 30 Division I conferences earned automatic bids to regionals.  The remaining 34 spots were awarded to schools as at-large invitees.

Bids by conference

National seeds
Bold indicates CWS participant.
Clemson

Regionals and super regionals

Bold indicates winner.

Clemson Super Regional

Houston Super Regional

Corvallis Super Regional

Tuscaloosa Super Regional

Fullerton Super Regional

Oxford Super Regional

Athens Super Regional

Atlanta Super Regional

College World Series

Participants

Bracket

Championship series

Saturday 6/24

Championship Game #1: 6:00 PM

Note: 77 minute rain delay in top of 6th inning

Sunday 6/25

Championship Game #2: 6:00 PM

Monday 6/26

Championship Game #3: 6:00 PM

All-Tournament Team
The following players were members of the All-Tournament Team.

Tournament performance by conference

Notes on tournament field 
 Lehigh, UNC Asheville, San Francisco, Prairie View, and Sacred Heart were making their first NCAA tournament appearance.

References

NCAA Division I Baseball Championship
 
Baseball in Austin, Texas
Baseball in Houston